The 1927 All-Ireland Senior Football Championship Final was the fortieth All-Ireland Final and the deciding match of the 1927 All-Ireland Senior Football Championship, an inter-county Gaelic football tournament for the top teams in Ireland.

Kerry led 0-3 to 0-0 early on, but Kildare won with points by Paul Keogh, Paul Doyle (2), Bill "Squires" Gannon and Joe Curtis. Republican leader John Joe Sheehy hit the post late on, and Kildare held on for victory.

References

External links
"Kildare 1927 Champions", a British Pathé newsreel of the game

All-Ireland Senior Football Championship Final
All-Ireland Senior Football Championship Final, 1927
All-Ireland Senior Football Championship Finals
Kerry county football team matches
Kildare county football team matches